The University of Florida's cycling club was officially founded in 1985 and has won numerous Southeastern Collegiate Cycling Conference and National Collegiate Cycling Association championships.

History 

 The first known edition of the University of Florida's Cycling Club was started in the late 1970s by a group of students who began meeting informally for recreational rides.  By 1981, they were still meeting, but since almost all had graduated, they changed the group's name to the Gainesville Cycling Club.  In Fall 1985, students of Richard Beck's Cycling Class, and other racers, organized a formal, university sanctioned, bicycle racing sports club (Team Florida).  From 1986-1988, with significant funding from student government, and sponsor support from Peddlers Bike Shop, Cannondale, Continental Tires, Puma, Lake Shoes, Desente, Zepher Helmets, Go sports drink, Jolt cola, Chance Chiropractic and the Bicycle Club Apartments, the team's top riders competed in pro-am United States Cycling Federation (USCF) races throughout the United States, but primarily within the Southeast.  Team Florida joined the Southeastern Collegiate Cycling Conference (SECCC) of the National Collegiate Cycling Association (NCCA) in 1989 and began racing in both USCF and NCCA races.

Team Florida's first participation in an organized race was a Primo Bike Works' 10 mile time trial starting and finishing at the Hopewell Baptist Church on Wacahoota Road Southwest of Gainesville in late 1985 or early 1986.  The first Team Florida win was achieved by Paul Chludzinski in a Citizen's Class criterium in Cocoa Beach in spring 1986.  The team's first USCF licensed win was secured by Michael Franovich in a Category IV road race on the Sawgrass Expressway, prior to its July 3, 1986 opening.  The first collegiate race win was accomplished by Geoff Rogers in a “B” Category Race at the University of Georgia in 1989.

Although bike races had been held on campus as early as the 1950s, the first race hosted by Team Florida was held in Fall 1986.  The six turn USCF sanctioned criterium ran clockwise.  It featured a start/finish in front of the Florida Gym on Stadium Road, turned right onto North South Drive (now known as Gale Lemerand Drive) pass the stadium, turned right onto East West Drive (turn no longer exists due to North stadium stands construction), from East West Drive right onto Fletcher Drive, left on what was a road between Pugh and Dauer Halls, right onto Buckman Drive which becomes Stadium Road, and past the Hub before returning to the start/finish.  Andy Woodruff, who would eventually ride for Team Florida in the early 1990s,  won the Men's Pro, 1,2,3 race.  Team sponsored circuit races around Lake Alice were held in 1987 and 1988. The first Stage Race was held in 1989 and featured a downtown twilight criterium and a road race on Dungarvin Road.

Team Florida was recognized as the University of Florida's Sports Club of the Year for 2015-2016.  In 2017, with student interest in racing declining, Team Florida leadership chose to have the club focus on noncompetitive recreational riding, the team lost its standing as a sports club, and stopped participating in SECCC events.  As of October 2019 however, the team had regained its status as a UF Sports Club.  Following a lengthy delay associated with the pandemic, Team Florida began competing in SECCC collegiate races again in Fall 2021.

Southeastern Collegiate Cycling Conference Championships

Road 
1989 Team Time Trial (Phil Huckabee,Tim Hefner, David Suro and Geoff Rogers)
 1990 Women's A (Julie Maupin)
 1994 Men's A (Jamie Bennett)
 1994 Men's C (Dennis Angelo)
 1996 Team 
 1996 Women's A (Marjon Marik)
 1996 Men's B (Eric Gerolstein)
 1996 Men's C (Dave Daniel)
 1997 Team 
 1997 Women's A (Marjon Marik)
 1997 Men's A (Saul Yeaton)
 1997 Men's C (Rob Murray)
 1998 Team 
 1998 Women's A (Marjon Marik)
 1998 Men's B (Paul Brushwood)
 1998 Men's C (Chad Mallory)
 2000 Team
 2000 Men's C (Philip Thompson)
 2001 Team
 2002 Team
 2003 Team
 2004 Team
 2005 Men's B (Rob Newsom)
 2006 Women's B (Courtney Dehon)
 2007 Team D1 Non-varsity Champs
 2012 Men's A (Neal Shepard)
2013 Team
2014 Team

Track 
 TBD

Mountain Bike 
 1999 Team 
 1999 Women's A (Karen Kolinski)
 1999 Men's B (Victor Gonzalez)
 1999 Men's C (Javier Barrio)
 2000 Team 
 2000 Women's A (Karen Kolinski)
 2000 Men's A (Cody Ward)
 2001 Team
 2001 Women's A (Andrea Martin)
 2001 Men's A (Erik DeKold)
 2001 Men's C (Austin Gregorzek)
 2004 Men's A (Ryan Fisher)
 2004 Women's A (Teresa Garcia)
 2004 Men's C (Eric Oppenheimer)
 2005 Team
 2005 Men's A (Jason Codding)
 2005 Women's A (Teresa Garcia)
 2005 Women's B (Natalia Shelton)
 2005 Men's C (Ian Knabe)
 2006 Team D1 Non-varsity Champs
 2006 Women's A (Tracey Wallace)
 2006 Women's B (Stephanie Sherril)
 2006 Men's C (Konstantinos Charizanis)
 2007 Team D1 Non-varsity Champs
 2007 Men's A (Chris Janiszewski)
 2007 Men's B (Ian Knabe)
 2007 Men's C (Brian Fane)
 2008 Team D1 Non-varsity Champs
 2009 Team D1 Non-varsity Champs
 2012 Men's A (Victor Alber)

Cyclocross 
 2012 Men's A (Dustin White)
2013 Men's A (Dustin White)
2013 Men's B (Justin Runac)

National Collegiate Cycling Championships

Road 
 1998 Women's A Criterium (Jody Radkewich)
 2005 Women's A Overall (Rebecca Larson)
2005 Women's A Criterium (Rebecca Larson)
 2006 Women's A Overall (Rebecca Larson)
 2007 Women's A Road Race (Rebecca Larson)
 2009 Men's A Overall (Bobby Sweeting)

Track 
 1997 Women's A Points Race (Marjon Marik) 
 1998 Men's A Point's Race (Dan Larson)
2003 Women's A Sprints (Rebecca McClintock)
2003 Women's A 2K Pursuit (Rebecca McClintock)
2003 Women's A Overall (Rebecca McClintock)
2003 Women's A Italian Pursuit (Rebecca McClintock, Lori Palmer)
2003 Men's A Italian Pursuit (Dan Larson, Steve Heal, Marco Verwijs, David Suarez)

Mountain Bike 
 TBD

Cyclocross 
 TBD

Notable alumni 

Karen Bliss - Team Coach (US Bicycling Hall of Fame inductee, Multi time US National Champion)
Jacquelyn Crowell (Multi time US National Champion)
 Phil Gaimon (World Tour Rider and former Everesting world record holder)
 John Lieswyn (US Professional ITT and TTT Champion, represented the United States 5 times in the UCI Road World Championships Elite Men's Road Race)
Bobby Livingston - Team Coach (US Olympian)
Steve Heal - General Manager of The World's Largest Yeti Dealer (Wheat Ridge Cylcery)

Club Presidents 

 1985-1986 Thom Cerny
 1986-1987 J.C. Conte
 1987-1988 Tony McKnight
 1988-1989 Kevin Claney
 1989-1990 Chris Furlow
 1990-1991 Sean Gregoryck
 1991-1992 Chris Putman 
 1992-1993 Mike Gann 
 1993 Basil Moutsopolous 
 1994 Phil Weber 
 1994-1995 Jamie Kreminski 
 1995-1996 Matt Mercer 
 1996-1997 Doug Zerbarini 
 1997-1998 Jared Zimlin 
 1998 Dan Larson
 1998-1999 Eric Gerolstein 
 1999 Chad Mallory 
 2000 Angelo Matthews 
 2000 2001 Erik DeKold
 2001-2002 Alex Rodriguez
 2002-2003 Steve Heal
 2003-2004 J.D. Herlihy
 2004-2005 Brad Davis
 2005-2006 Elizabeth Heal
 2006-2007 Phil Bailey
 2007-2008 Eric Shields 
 2008-2009 David Reich
 2009-2010 Thomas Tran
 2010-2011 Kristin Donahue
 2011-2012 Derek Schanze
 2012-2013 Dustin White
 2013-2014 Chistian Trucco
 2014-2015 Tony Cofrancesco
 2015-2016 Maria Hyde
 2016-2017 Benjamin Matalon
 2017-2018 Blake Norman
 2018-2019 Andrew Marques
 2019-2020 Akram Weheba

Team Kits Gallery

References

University of Florida
Cycling teams established in 1985
1985 establishments in Florida
Cycling teams based in the United States